is a former Japanese footballer.

Club career
Takahashi joined Australian side Box Hill United SC in early 2020. He previously played for Albirex Niigata Singapore, on loan from Montedio Yamagata.

Career statistics

Club

References

External links 
 
 

1998 births
Living people
Sportspeople from Yamagata Prefecture
Association football people from Yamagata Prefecture
Japanese footballers
Japanese expatriate footballers
Association football defenders
Japan Soccer College players
Montedio Yamagata players
Albirex Niigata Singapore FC players
Singapore Premier League players
Japanese expatriate sportspeople in Singapore
Japanese expatriate sportspeople in Australia
Expatriate footballers in Singapore
Expatriate soccer players in Australia